Zoggium is a fungal genus in the family Mytilinidiaceae. A monotypic genus, it contains the single species Zoggium mayorii, named after mycologist Hans Zogg. The species was originally described in 1952 as a species of Lophium by Zogg, who noted that it differed from other Lophium species in that its peridia were less fragile because of a rigid ascomata. In 2001, Vasilyeva considered the morphological differences sufficient to erect a new genus to contain the species. Z. mayorii is found in the Russian Far East and the Swiss and French Alps.

References

Fungi of Europe
Mytilinidiales
Monotypic Dothideomycetes genera